Elaine Yiu (born 21 November, 1980 in British Hong Kong) is a Hong Kong actress and television host contracted to TVB.

Career
Elaine Yiu entered the entertainment industry after winning the TVB8 Presentator Contest in 2002, subsequently signing a management and filming contract with TVB. From 2002 to 2004, Yiu hosted Mandarin-language television programmes for TVB8. Yiu's acting debut was in the 2003 teen drama Hearts of Fencing, portraying the nerdy girl Man Man.

At the 2015 TVB Star Awards Malaysia, Yiu earned the Favourite TVB Supporting Actress and Favourite TVB Drama Character awards with her role as Vivian Cheung Wai-man (張慧芸) in the legal drama Raising the Bar (四個女仔三個BAR). Yiu's red-hot winning streak continued two weeks later in Hong Kong when she won the "Best Supporting Actress" award at the 2015 TVB Anniversary Awards with her role as Imperial Consort Yim (炎貴妃) in the ancient drama Captain of Destiny (張保仔).

In 2017, Yiu won the TVB Star Awards Malaysia for Favourite TVB Supporting Actress award again with her role in the 2017 action drama The Unholy Alliance (同盟) as Kate Wai Yee-yiu (韋以柔), which was her second win in the category.

In 2021, with her role as Anson Lui Kin (雷堅) in the drama The Ringmaster (拳王), Yiu was placed among the top 5 nominees for the Best Actress at the 2021 TVB Anniversary Awards.

Personal life
Elaine Yiu attended RMIT University and majored in computer science.

She has a sister, Sandy Yiu, who works in Now TV (Hong Kong) as a news presenter.

Yiu is best friends with Myolie Wu, Nancy Wu, Paisley Wu, Mandy Wong and Selena Lee. They had formed the friendship group “胡說八道會” and had filmed a travel show together.

Due to their common interest in long-distance running, Yiu along with Benjamin Yuen, Joel Chan, Brian Tse, Jack Wu, Nancy Wu, Paisley Wu, Selena Lee and Mandy Wong formed the group “Crazy Runner”.

Filmography

Films 
 I Love Hong Kong (2011)

Awards

Reference

External links
 Official TVB Blog of Elaine Yiu
 Elaine Yiu on Sina Weibo
 

1980 births
Living people
Hong Kong television actresses
TVB veteran actors
RMIT University alumni
21st-century Hong Kong actresses